Closson may refer to:

Georges Closson (1865–1945), French architect
Gilles-François Closson (1796–1842), landscape painter
Henry W. Closson (1832–1917), career officer in the United States Army
William Closson (1848–1926), American artist

See also
Classon
Clisson
Klassen